The 1985 Texas Longhorns baseball team represented the University of Texas at Austin in the 1985 NCAA Division I baseball season. The Longhorns played their home games at Disch–Falk Field. The team was coached by Cliff Gustafson in his 18th season at Texas.

The Longhorns reached the College World Series final, but were eliminated by Miami (FL).

Personnel

Roster

Coaches

Schedule 

! style="background:#BF5700;color:white;"| Regular season
|- valign="top" 

|- bgcolor="#ccffcc"
| February 15 ||  || Disch–Falk Field • Austin, TX || W 5–0 || 1–0 || 
|- bgcolor="#ccffcc"
| February 15 || Texas Lutheran || Disch–Falk Field • Austin, TX || W 8–1 || 2–0 || 
|- bgcolor="#ccffcc"
| February 16 ||  || Disch–Falk Field • Austin, TX || W 13–0 || 3–0 || 
|- align="center" bgcolor="ffbbb"
| February 16 || Texas–Arlington || Disch–Falk Field • Austin, TX || L 13–14 || 3–1 || 
|- align="center" bgcolor="ffbbb"
| February 17 || Texas–Arlington || Disch–Falk Field • Austin, TX || L 1–7 || 3–2 || 
|- bgcolor="#ccffcc"
| February 17 || Texas–Arlington || Disch–Falk Field • Austin, TX || W 18–6 || 4–2 || 
|- bgcolor="#ccffcc"
| February 22 || at  || Packard Stadium • Tempe, AZ || W 13–713 || 5–2 || 
|- bgcolor="#ccffcc"
| February 23 || at Arizona State || Packard Stadium • Tempe, AZ || W 9–5 || 6–2 || 
|- bgcolor="#ccffcc"
| February 24 || at Arizona State || Packard Stadium • Tempe, AZ || W 6–510 || 7–2 || 
|-

|- bgcolor="#ccffcc"
| March 1 ||  || Disch–Falk Field • Austin, TX || W 14–10 || 8–2 || 
|- bgcolor="#ccffcc"
| March 1 || St. Mary's (TX) || Disch–Falk Field • Austin, TX || W 11–6 || 9–2 || 
|- align="center" bgcolor="ffbbb"
| March 2 ||  || Disch–Falk Field • Austin, TX || L 5–6 || 9–3 || 
|- bgcolor="#ccffcc"
| March 3 || Oklahoma || Disch–Falk Field • Austin, TX || W 2–1 || 10–3 || 
|- bgcolor="#ccffcc"
| March 4 ||  || Disch–Falk Field • Austin, TX || W 5–1 || 11–3 || 
|- bgcolor="#ccffcc"
| March 5 || Cal State Fullerton || Disch–Falk Field • Austin, TX || W 4–317 || 12–3 || 
|- bgcolor="#ccffcc"
| March 6 || Cal State Fullerton || Disch–Falk Field • Austin, TX || W 10–7 || 13–3 || 
|- bgcolor="#ccffcc"
| March 8 ||  || Disch–Falk Field • Austin, TX || W 4–1 || 14–3 || 
|- bgcolor="#ccffcc"
| March 8 || Kansas State || Disch–Falk Field • Austin, TX || W 14–5 || 15–3 || 
|- bgcolor="#ccffcc"
| March 9 || Kansas State || Disch–Falk Field • Austin, TX || W 9–1 || 16–3 || 
|- bgcolor="#ccffcc"
| March 9 || Kansas State || Disch–Falk Field • Austin, TX || W 11–0 || 17–3 || 
|- bgcolor="#ccffcc"
| March 10 ||  || Disch–Falk Field • Austin, TX || W 2–0 || 18–3 || 
|- bgcolor="#ccffcc"
| March 10 || Emporia State || Disch–Falk Field • Austin, TX || W 18–1 || 19–3 || 
|- bgcolor="#ccffcc"
| March 11 || Emporia State || Disch–Falk Field • Austin, TX || W 6–2 || 20–3 || 
|- bgcolor="#ccffcc"
| March 11 || Emporia State || Disch–Falk Field • Austin, TX || W 13–0 || 21–3 || 
|- bgcolor="#ccffcc"
| March 12 ||  || Disch–Falk Field • Austin, TX || W 2–0 || 22–3 || 
|- bgcolor="#ccffcc"
| March 12 || Hardin–Simmons || Disch–Falk Field • Austin, TX || W 16–6 || 23–3 || 
|- bgcolor="#ccffcc"
| March 13 ||  || Disch–Falk Field • Austin, TX || W 20–4 || 24–3 || 
|- bgcolor="#ccffcc"
| March 13 || Dallas Baptist || Disch–Falk Field • Austin, TX || W 13–3 || 25–3 || 
|- bgcolor="#ccffcc"
| March 14 || Dallas Baptist || Disch–Falk Field • Austin, TX || W 10–0 || 26–3 || 
|- bgcolor="#ccffcc"
| March 14 || Dallas Baptist || Disch–Falk Field • Austin, TX || W 12–2 || 27–3 || 
|- bgcolor="#ccffcc"
| March 16 ||  || Disch–Falk Field • Austin, TX || W 4–3 || 28–3 || 
|- bgcolor="#ccffcc"
| March 16 || Oklahoma City || Disch–Falk Field • Austin, TX || W 4–0 || 29–3 || 
|- bgcolor="#ccffcc"
| March 17 ||  || Disch–Falk Field • Austin, TX || W 15–1 || 30–3 || 
|- bgcolor="#ccffcc"
| March 17 || Mankato State || Disch–Falk Field • Austin, TX || W 10–2 || 31–3 || 
|- align="center" bgcolor="ffbbb"
| March 23 || at  || George Cole Field • Fayetteville, AR || L 4–5 || 31–4 || 0–1
|- align="center" bgcolor="ffbbb"
| March 24 || at Arkansas || George Cole Field • Fayetteville, AR || L 1–2 || 31–5 || 0–2
|- bgcolor="#ccffcc"
| March 24 || at Arkansas || George Cole Field • Fayetteville, AR || W 13–3 || 32–5 || 1–2
|- align="center" bgcolor="ffbbb"
| March 25 || at Oklahoma || L. Dale Mitchell Baseball Park • Norman, OK || L 3–6 || 32–6 || 
|- bgcolor="#ccffcc"
| March 29 ||  || Disch–Falk Field • Austin, TX || W 5–0 || 33–6 || 2–2
|- align="center" bgcolor="ffbbb"
| March 30 || TCU || Disch–Falk Field • Austin, TX || L 2–4 || 33–7 || 2–3
|- bgcolor="#ccffcc"
| March 30 || TCU || Disch–Falk Field • Austin, TX || W 10–5 || 34–7 || 3–3
|-

|- align="center" bgcolor="ffbbb"
| April 2 ||  || Disch–Falk Field • Austin, TX || L 4–7 || 34–8 || 
|- bgcolor="#ccffcc"
| April 2 || Lubbock Christian || Disch–Falk Field • Austin, TX || W 14–0 || 35–8 || 
|- bgcolor="#ccffcc"
| April 5 || at  || Ferrell Field • Waco, TX || W 5–1 || 36–8 || 4–3
|- align="center" bgcolor="ffbbb"
| April 6 || at Baylor || Ferrell Field • Waco, TX || L 3–8 || 36–9 || 4–4
|- align="center" bgcolor="ffbbb"
| April 6 || at Baylor || Ferrell Field • Waco, TX || L 3–10 || 36–10 || 4–5
|- bgcolor="#ccffcc"
| April 9 ||  || Disch–Falk Field • Austin, TX || W 6–1 || 37–10 || 
|- bgcolor="#ccffcc"
| April 9 || Southwestern || Disch–Falk Field • Austin, TX || W 14–3 || 38–10 || 
|- bgcolor="#ccffcc"
| April 12 ||  || Disch–Falk Field • Austin, TX || W 6–5 || 39–10 || 5–5
|- bgcolor="#ccffcc"
| April 14 || Rice || Disch–Falk Field • Austin, TX || W 5–4 || 40–10 || 6–5
|- bgcolor="#ccffcc"
| April 14 || Rice || Disch–Falk Field • Austin, TX || W 9–0 || 41–10 || 7–5
|- bgcolor="#ccffcc"
| April 15 || Oklahoma State || Disch–Falk Field • Austin, TX || W 9–4 || 42–10 || 
|- bgcolor="#ccffcc"
| April 15 || Oklahoma State || Disch–Falk Field • Austin, TX || W 13–12 || 43–10 || 
|- bgcolor="#ccffcc"
| April 19 ||  || Disch–Falk Field • Austin, TX || W 9–2 || 44–10 || 8–5
|- bgcolor="#ccffcc"
| April 20 || Texas Tech || Disch–Falk Field • Austin, TX || W 16–15 || 45–10 || 9–5
|- bgcolor="#ccffcc"
| April 20 || Texas Tech || Disch–Falk Field • Austin, TX || W 8–2 || 46–10 || 10–5
|- bgcolor="#ccffcc"
| April 26 || at  || Olsen Field • College Station, TX || W 9–5 || 47–10 || 11–5
|- bgcolor="#ccffcc"
| April 27 || at Texas A&M || Olsen Field • College Station, TX || W 9–2 || 48–10 || 12–5
|- bgcolor="#ccffcc"
| April 27 || at Texas A&M || Olsen Field • College Station, TX || W 8–7 || 49–10 || 13–5
|-

|- bgcolor="#ccffcc"
| May 4 ||  || Disch–Falk Field • Austin, TX || W 8–0 || 50–10 || 14–5
|- bgcolor="#ccffcc"
| May 4 || Houston || Disch–Falk Field • Austin, TX || W 15–4 || 51–10 || 15–5
|- bgcolor="#ccffcc"
| May 5 || Houston || Disch–Falk Field • Austin, TX || W 11–9 || 52–10 || 16–5
|- bgcolor="#ccffcc"
| May 11 ||  || Disch–Falk Field • Austin, TX || W 4–1 || 53–10 || 
|- bgcolor="#ccffcc"
| May 12 || New Orleans || Disch–Falk Field • Austin, TX || W 15–3 || 54–10 || 
|-

|-
! style="background:#BF5700;color:white;"| Postseason
|-

|- bgcolor="#ccffcc"
| May 17 ||  || George Cole Field • Fayetteville, AR || W 5–0 || 55–10 || 1–0
|- align="center" bgcolor="ffbbb"
| May 18 ||  || George Cole Field • Fayetteville, AR || L 5–9 || 55–11 || 1–1
|- bgcolor="#ccffcc"
| May 19 || Houston || George Cole Field • Fayetteville, AR || W 14–6 || 56–11 || 2–1
|- align="center" bgcolor="ffbbb"
| May 19 || Arkansas || George Cole Field • Fayetteville, AR || L 6–10 || 56–12 || 2–2
|-

|- bgcolor="#ccffcc"
| May 23 ||  || Disch–Falk Field • Austin, TX || W 4–312 || 57–12 || 1–0
|- bgcolor="#ccffcc"
| May 24 ||  || Disch–Falk Field • Austin, TX || W 9–2 || 58–12 || 2–0
|- bgcolor="#ccffcc"
| May 25 ||  || Disch–Falk Field • Austin, TX || W 9–4 || 59–12 || 3–0
|- bgcolor="#ccffcc"
| May 26 ||  || Disch–Falk Field • Austin, TX || W 10–2 || 60–12 || 4–0
|-

|- bgcolor="#ccffcc"
| June 1 || Arizona || Johnny Rosenblatt Stadium • Omaha, NE || W 2–1 || 61–12 || 1–0
|- bgcolor="#ccffcc"
| June 5 || Miami (FL) || Johnny Rosenblatt Stadium • Omaha, NE || W 8–4 || 62–12 || 2–0
|- bgcolor="#ccffcc"
| June 7 ||  || Johnny Rosenblatt Stadium • Omaha, NE || W 12–7 || 63–12 || 3–0
|- bgcolor="#ccffcc"
| June 8 ||  || Johnny Rosenblatt Stadium • Omaha, NE || W 8–710 || 64–12 || 4–0
|- align="center" bgcolor="ffbbb"
| June 9 || Miami (FL) || Johnny Rosenblatt Stadium • Omaha, NE || L 1–2 || 64–13 || 4–1
|- align="center" bgcolor="ffbbb"
| June 11 || Miami (FL) || Johnny Rosenblatt Stadium • Omaha, NE || L 6–10 || 64–14 || 4–2
|-

References 

Texas Longhorns baseball seasons
Texas Longhorns
College World Series seasons
Southwest Conference baseball champion seasons
Texas Longhorns baseball